Joel Mogorosi (born August 2, 1984) is a Motswana footballer who currently plays as a striker for Botswana Premier League side Gaborone United and the Botswana national team. He is noted for his fast play and quick feet. Mogorosi scored his first international goal by volleying the ball outside the box against Togo on 4 September 2010. His second international goal was against Sweden on 19 January 2011.

 It was confirmed that South African club Bloemfontein Celtic finally signed Mogorosi on a three-year deal after the two football clubs reached an agreement in July 2012.

International career

Mogorosi officially made his international debut for Botswana on 31 May 2008 against Madagascar in a FIFA World Cup qualifying match, the match ended as a goalless draw.

He scored his first goal for Botswana against Togo in an Africa Cup of Nations qualifying match, Botswana won the match 2–1.

He scored his first double in a Friendly match against South Sudan, Botswana won the match 3–0.

International goals
Scores and results list Botswana's goal tally first.

References 

1984 births
Living people
People from Gaborone
Botswana footballers
Botswana international footballers
Botswana expatriate footballers
South African Premier Division players
Cypriot First Division players
Gilport Lions F.C. players
Township Rollers F.C. players
AEP Paphos FC players
APOP Kinyras FC players
Mochudi Centre Chiefs SC players
Bloemfontein Celtic F.C. players
Gaborone United S.C. players
Association football forwards
Expatriate footballers in Cyprus
Botswana expatriate sportspeople in Cyprus
Expatriate soccer players in South Africa
Botswana expatriate sportspeople in South Africa